Aetobatus narutobiei, the Naru eagle ray, is a species of cartilaginous fish of the eagle ray family, Myliobatidae. It is found in the northwest Pacific off south Japan, South Korea, China, Hong Kong and Vietnam.

Until 2013, this species was included in the longheaded eagle ray (Aetobatus flagellum), but the two differ in genetics, morphology, size and range (the smaller longhead eagle ray is from the Indian Ocean). Although little information exists for this species throughout most of its range, the life history and ecology has been reasonably well studied in Japanese waters. In the Ariake Bay region of Kyushu Island where it is numerous, it is considered a pest that preys on commercially valuable farmed bivalves and large numbers are culled every year.

References

Aetobatus
Marine fauna of East Asia
Fish described in 2013